International Music Publications (better known as IMP) is a British publisher of popular sheet music.

History
It began as the European arm of Warner Brothers Publications' sheet music business, and was one of the UK's largest sheet music publishers. Warner was purchased by Alfred Publishing in 2005; IMP was sold on to Faber Music.

References

Sheet music publishing companies
Music publishing companies of the United Kingdom